Lorenzo Bergonzoni (1646 – after 1700) was an Italian painter of the Baroque period. He was born and active in Bologna. He was first a pupil of Giovanni Battista Bolognini, but afterwards studied under Guercino in Cento. He is also called Lorenzo Bergunzi. He became known mostly as a portrait painter at Bologna.

References

1646 births
Italian male painters
Painters from Bologna
Italian Baroque painters
18th-century deaths